The olive woodpecker (Dendropicos griseocephalus) is a species of bird in the woodpecker family Picidae.

Taxonomy
The olive woodpecker was described by the French polymath Georges-Louis Leclerc, Comte de Buffon in 1780 in his Histoire Naturelle des Oiseaux from a specimen obtained from the Cape of Good Hope area of South Africa. The bird was also illustrated in a hand-coloured plate engraved by François-Nicolas Martinet in the Planches Enluminées D'Histoire Naturelle which was produced under the supervision of Edme-Louis Daubenton to accompany Buffon's text.  Neither the plate caption nor Buffon's description included a scientific name but in 1783 the Dutch naturalist Pieter Boddaert coined the binomial name Picus griseocephalus in his catalogue of the Planches Enluminées. The olive woodpecker is now placed in the genus Dendropicos that was introduced by the French ornithologist Alfred Malherbe in 1849. The generic name is from the Ancient Greek dendron meaning tree and pikos for woodpecker. The specific epithet griseocephalus combines the Medieval Latin griseus meaning "grey" and the Ancient Greek -kephalos meaning "-headed".

Three subspecies are recognised:
 D. g. ruwenzori (Sharpe, 1902) – Angola, north Zambia, north Malawi and central Tanzania to southeast DR Congo and southwest Uganda
 D. g. kilimensis (Neumann, 1926) – north and east Tanzania
 D. g. griseocephalus (Boddaert, 1783) – south Mozambique to South Africa

Distribution and habitat
The olive woodpecker is native to central, east and southern Africa, from the Ruwenzori Mountains to the Western Cape. It is found in Angola, Burundi, DRC, Eswatini, Malawi, Mozambique, Namibia, Rwanda, South Africa, Tanzania, Uganda, Zambia, and Zimbabwe.

References

External links

 Olive woodpecker - Species text in The Atlas of Southern African Birds
 Xeno-canto: audio recordings of the olive woodpecker

olive woodpecker
Birds of Southern Africa
olive woodpecker
Taxonomy articles created by Polbot